Penny Tai (born 22 April 1978) is a Malaysian singer, songwriter, producer and director. Since her debut in 2000, she has achieved many successes in her music career, including winning 5 Golden Melody Awards.

In addition to performing arts, Tai is enthusiastic about charity and was elected as one of Malaysia's Top Ten Outstanding Youths in 2011.

Life and career
Tai started songwriting at the age of 17, participating in the Halo Songwriting Contest in Kuala Lumpur, a platform which also launched the career of fellow Malaysian singer, Fish Leong. In 1999 she was offered a contract by EMI Music (Taiwan) and moved to Taiwan pursue a career in singing and songwriting. She released her self-titled first album, Penny, in January 2000.

In 2006, she won Best Composer at the Golden Melody Awards for the song "Crazy Love" (title track to her 2005 album), becoming the first Malaysian artist to win a Golden Melody Award.

She subsequently won the Golden Melody Award for Best Female Mandarin Singer and Best Album Producer at the 25th Golden Melody Awards in 2014.

She formed the band Buddha Jump with the band D-power and released their first album, Buddha Jump, on 23 September 2011. Buddha Jump won the Golden Melody Award for Best Musical Group in 2015.

Her most popular song to date internationally was the end theme for the Taiwanese drama Meteor Garden entitled The Love You Want (你要的愛).

She married Sidney Lu on 27 December 2014.

Discography

Solo
 Penny (1 February 2000)
 How's That? (怎樣) (22 January 2001)
 Just Sing It (13 April 2002)
 No Penny, No Gain (24 March 2003)
 So Penny (9 February 2004) – New + Best Selection
 Crazy Love (愛瘋了) (31 March 2005)
 iPenny (6 October 2006)
 Forgive Me For Being The Girl I Am (原諒我就是這樣的女生) (16 May 2009)
 On the Way Home (回家路上) (1 November 2011)
 Unexpected (純屬意外) (27 May 2013)
 Thief (賊) (13 August 2016)
 The Passive Audience (被動的觀眾) (29 June 2022)

With Buddha Jump
 Buddha Jump  (佛跳牆) (23 September 2011)
 Show You (給你看) (30 December 2014)
 BJ Shop (BJ肆) (7 November 2019)

Awards and nominations

Golden Melody Awards
The Golden Melody Awards is an honor awarded by the Ministry of Culture of Taiwan to recognize outstanding achievement in the Chinese music industry and it has constantly been recognized as the equivalent to the Grammy Awards in Chinese-speaking world.

References

External links
 EMI Music profile

1978 births
Living people
21st-century Malaysian women singers
Malaysian Mandopop singers
Malaysian guitarists
Mandopop singer-songwriters
People from Johor
Malaysian people of Chinese descent
Malaysian people of Hakka descent
Hakka musicians
Malaysian expatriates in Taiwan
21st-century guitarists
21st-century women guitarists